This is a list of German television related events from 2017.

Events
9 February - Levina is selected to represent Germany at the 2017 Eurovision Song Contest with her song "Perfect Life". She is selected to be the sixty-second German Eurovision entry during Unser Song 2017 held at the Köln-Mülheim Studios in Cologne.

Debuts
4 Blocks
Babylon Berlin
 Bad Cop - kriminell gut
 Charité (TV series)
Dark (TV series)
 Einstein (German TV series)
 Love Island (German TV series)
 Magda macht das schon!
Nacktes Überleben - Wie wenig ist genug?
 Professor T. (German TV series)
Das Sacher
 The Same Sky (TV series)
The Worst Witch (2017 TV series)
 You Are Wanted

Television shows

1950s
Tagesschau (1952–present)

1960s
 heute (1963-present)

1970s
 heute-journal (1978-present)
 Tagesthemen (1978-present)

1980s
Lindenstraße (1985–present)

1990s
Gute Zeiten, schlechte Zeiten (1992–present)
Unter uns (1994-present)
Schloss Einstein (1998–present)
In aller Freundschaft (1998–present)
Wer wird Millionär? (1999-present)

2000s
Deutschland sucht den Superstar (2002–present)
Let's Dance (2006–present)
Das Supertalent (2007–present)

2010s
The Voice of Germany (2011-present)
Promi Big Brother (2013–present)

Ending this year
 Bad Cop - kriminell gut
Maya the Bee (TV series)
Das Sacher

See also
2017 in Germany